The Brazilian Federation of Associations of Librarians, Information Scientists and Institutions (but simply known by its acronym FEBAB) is a non-profit organization in Brazil. Its mission is to "defend and encourage the development of the profession." FEBAB is the oldest library association in the country, founded in 1959; it is also the largest. Its headquarters is in São Paulo. The organization is a federation of 16 library associations, some active and some inactive, one for each state of Brazil. Each state library association has its own organization and governing body, but generally meet in conjunction with other FEBAB meetings. FEBAB members participate in international activities as part of the International Federation of Library Associations and Institutions (IFLA).

History

FEBAB emerged from a proposal by Laura Russo (1915-2001) and Rodolfo Rocha Júnior during the 2nd Congress of Libraries and Documentation (CBBD) in Salvador, Bahia in 1959. The organization as incorporated on July 26, 1959, with the main objective of defending and encouraging the development of librarianship as a profession. Laura Russo served as the first president of the organization, serving from 1961 to 1975.

Russo, along with Maria Alice Toledo Leite and Maria Helena Brandão procured a headquarters for the organization in São Paulo in 1969. The librarian Neusa Dias de Macedo noted in 1989 that the first thirty years of the organization was marked by "financial and administrative infrastructure difficulties".

The Brazilian Federal Council of Librarianship (CFB) was created in 1965. In contrast to FEBAB, which is responsible for training and promoting librarianship as a profession, the CFB acts as a representative body for librarians in the Brazilian state and federal government.

Governing structure

FEBAB consists of a general assembly, a board of directors, an executive board, a fiscal council, associated commissions, and working groups. Members of the executive board serve for three terms, and include a president, vice-president, directors of administration, communication and publications, events, political and professional training. It additionally includes the regional directors from the sixteens states of Brazil and a member of the fiscal council.

Commissions and Working Groups

FEBAB has 11 commissions and working groups, each with their own area of responsibility and governance. They roughly correspond to the commissions and working groups of other national library associations, and include the:

Brazilian Commission of University Libraries
Brazilian Commission of School Libraries
Brazilian Commission of Prison Libraries
Brazilian Commission on Copyright and Open Access
Working Group on Public Libraries
Working Group on Library Accessibility
Working Group on Cataloging
Working Group on Diversity and Gender
Working Group on Parliamentary Libraries
Working Group on Ethnic-Racial Relations and Decolonization
Working Group on Library Services for Vulnerable People

Events

FEBAB holds annual or biannual conferences, which include the Brazilian Congress on Library and Documentation (CBBD); the International Congress on Archives, Libraries, Documentation Centers and Museums; SENABRAILLE, the National Seminar on Braille Libraries; and the National Seminar of University Libraries.

Publications

The primary publication of FEBAB is an academic journal, the Revista Brasileira de Biblioteconomia e Documentação. It dates to 1973 and replaced an newsletter, Boletim Informativo, published since 1960. The organization also hosts numerous publications, notably of translations of international library standards and other documents issued by the International Federation of Library Associations.

See also

 List of libraries in Brazil
 International Federation of Library Associations (IFLA)

References

Libraries in Brazil
Professional associations based in Brazil
Library-related professional associations
Non-profit organisations based in Brazil
Political advocacy groups in Brazil
Organizations established in 1959
1959 establishments in Brazil